The 1959 NCAA Tennis Championships were the 14th annual NCAA-sponsored tournaments to determine the national champions of men's singles, doubles, and team collegiate tennis in the United States.

Notre Dame and Tulane shared the team championship, the first such title for both the Fighting Irish and the Green Wave. Both teams finished with 8 points in the final team standings.

Host site
This year's tournaments were contested at Northwestern University in Evanston, Illinois.

Team scoring
Until 1977, the men's team championship was determined by points awarded based on individual performances in the singles and doubles events.

References

External links
List of NCAA Men's Tennis Champions

NCAA Division I tennis championships
NCAA Division I Tennis Championships
NCAA Division I Tennis Championships